Jose Ramón Vecino Fernández (19 February 1958 – 5 July 2009) was a Spanish football player and manager.

Managerial career
Born in Quereño, Ourense, Vecinos managed several junior sides in his native Spain. He moved to Costa Rica after he earned his official coaching licence.

In October 2002 he took charge at Costa Rican top division side San Carlos after a spell at Herediano. In March 2003 he was dismissed at Costa Rican side San Carlos. He was the manager of Árabe Unido in Panama.

In June 2009 he reported to have signed for Salvadoran side Águila, only for the deal to fall through because Vecinos wanted to bring in his own backroom staff.

Death
Vecino drowned in July 2009 in Playa Grande, Costa Rica, aged only 51. He left three children (Jacobo, Belén y Adrián). He owned a restaurant in Liberia, Guanacaste and had lived in the country since 2000.

References

External links
El entrenador español José Ramón Vecinos Fernández, de 51 años, murió ahogado la tarde de ayer en Playa Grande, de Santa Cruz, Guanacaste. at Diario Extra 

1958 births
2009 deaths
Sportspeople from the Province of Ourense
Spanish football managers
Expatriate football managers in El Salvador
Expatriate football managers in Panama
C.S. Herediano managers
Accidental deaths in Costa Rica
Deaths by drowning